Edith Buchanan (born Mary Edith Mckay Buchanan) was a Canadian nurse who devoted her professional career to the development of nursing education in India. She is considered a pioneer who laid the foundation for nursing research and doctoral education in the field of nursing in India.

Education

Professional career 
Buchanan worked as a Sister-Tutor at the Lady Hardinge Medical College Hospital in Delhi. In 1943, she was appointed as Vice-Principal at the School of Nursing Administration in New Delhi. When the College of Nursing, New Delhi (now Rajkumari Amrit Kaur College of Nursing)was established in 1946, she became its Vice-Principal. In 1958 on the retirement of Margaretta Craig, Buchanan was appointed the Principal. She retired from service in 1964 and returned to Canada where she lived until her death in 2003.

Awards and honors 
Florence Nightingale Medal by the International Committee of the Red Cross (ICRC) in 1959.

References 

2003 deaths
Year of birth missing
Canadian nurses
University of Toronto alumni
McGill University alumni
Teachers College, Columbia University alumni
Canadian women nurses